Presidential elections were held in Cyprus on 25 February 1968. The result was a victory for the incumbent President Makarios III, who received 96% of the vote. Voter turnout was 93%.

Separate elections were held for the vice presidency, which were won by Fazıl Küçük.

Electoral system
The elections were held using a two-round system; if no candidate received over 50% of the vote in the first round, a second round was to be held between the top two candidates. The constitution required the President of Cyprus to be a Greek Cypriot and the Vice-President to be a Turkish Cypriot. Greek Cypriots elected the President and Turkish Cypriots elected the Vice-President.

Results

References

President
Cyprus
Presidential elections in Cyprus
Cyprus